Fliptop may refer to:

 a type of cigarette pack
 Flip-top bottle
 Flip Top, a 1977 album by American trumpeter Ted Curson 
 FlipTop Battle League, or Fliptop, a rap battle conference in the Philippines